Pollaclasis is a genus of fireflies in the beetle family Lampyridae. There is one described species in Pollaclasis, P. bifaria. Pollaclasis is most closely related to Pterotus, and may someday become included within the Pterotinae subfamily.

References

Further reading

 
 

Lampyridae
Articles created by Qbugbot